Samuel Barter (February 14, 1828 – December 16, 1908) was a member of the Wisconsin (USA) State Assembly in 1879.

Barter was born on February 14, 1828, in Kingskerswell, England. He came to Wisconsin in 1849, living in Markesan and originally employed as a merchant, later becoming a member of the county board of supervisors in Green Lake County. He then elected as a "president" of Markesan Village and was a Republican. He died in Hudson, Wisconsin.

References

External links

People from Teignbridge (district)
English emigrants to the United States
19th-century English people
People from Waukesha County, Wisconsin
People from Marquette County, Wisconsin
People from Markesan, Wisconsin
Republican Party members of the Wisconsin State Assembly
Mayors of places in Wisconsin
County supervisors in Wisconsin
1828 births
1908 deaths
19th-century American politicians